Stamboliyski is a town in southern Bulgaria, located on the right bank of Maritsa river and is a part of Plovdiv Province. It was founded in 1873–75, when the Istanbul-Belovo railway was built. It was initially called Gara Krichim ('Krichim Station') after the largest village in the vicinity then, Krichim.

History
The first settlers came from Brestovitsa and Perushtitsa, which together with railway workers from Peshtera established a village north of the railway line, which in 1926 had 224 residents. Refugees from the parts of Thrace and Macedonia under foreign rule arrived in 1926–1928 and the population grew to 554 in 1934. Industrialists from the larger cities founded factories in Gara Krichim and the village developed into a regional centre of industry and transport. It was proclaimed a town in 1964, and after the village of Krichim also acquired town status in 1969, it was renamed Novi Krichim ('New Krichim'). In 1979, the name was changed to Stamboliyski in honour of Aleksandar Stamboliyski, a former Prime Minister of Bulgaria and agrarian leader.

Culture

Regular events
Once a year there is a celebration of the city, which lasts for three days. The date changes each year according to the religious holiday Holy Spirit. Also, every Saturday there is a market near the center.

Public institutions
 Community Center Vaptsarov develop the following activities: Youth Dance Ensemble "Yuzhnyache"; Kids Vocal Studio; Schools ballet and art; Music schools; Courses in English and German; Football team "Thrace";

The town of Stamboliyski successfully develops the "Taekwondo Club Trakiets".

Schools
 School "Hristo Botev"
 School "Otets Paisiy"
 School "Hristo Smirnenski"

References

External links

Towns in Bulgaria
Populated places in Plovdiv Province